The flag of Ambazonia is a flag used by Ambazonian separatists and the national of the Federal Republic of Ambazonia, an unrecognised breakaway state in West Africa. Originally designed and adopted by the Southern Cameroons National Council in 1999, it has since been universally embraced by Ambazonian separatist movements.

Symbolism 
According to the Ambazonia Governing Council, the components of the flag symbolize the following:

Blue: Democracy, the plurality of the people and the rule of law, potential for growth and development, and for faith in God.
White: Purity, transparency, accountability in life and governance, and intolerance of mediocrities and corruption.
Dove: Principles of God and peace and tranquility.
Green leaves carried by the dove: Assurance of good news even in stormy circumstances, truth and justice, a promise of peace, prosperity, productivity and success.
13 stars: The 13 counties of Ambazonia.
Golden color: Priceless value of all 13 counties, balanced development, and equity and equality among the counties.
The dove's flight: Visionary focus, hard work, liberty and freedom.

Other flags

Notes

References 

Ambazonia
Flags displaying animals
Ambazonia
Ambazonia